Lee Wai Tong (16 October 1905 – 4 July 1979) was a Hong Kong and Chinese international association football player, head coach, and former Vice President of FIFA. He is often regarded as the greatest Chinese footballer due to his accomplishments in winning several Far Eastern Games titles with the national team of the Republic of China as well as captaining the national football squad to their first ever Olympic tournament in 1936, which was held in Berlin.

This was also followed by having an extremely successful club career with the Hong Kong club South China where he won eight league titles with them, helping establish the club as the most successful team in the territory's history at the time. After his retirement, he moved into management where he guided the national men's football team of the Republic of China (which later played as Taiwan and Chinese Taipei) to win the 1954 Asian Games.

Playing career

Lee Wai Tong was born in Tai Hang, Hong Kong, just outside the city, as the third child to a construction firm owner before he moved back to his parents home of Ng-Wah County in Mei-Chow, Kwangtung, China at the age of four. It was there that he was informally taught how to play football until he moved back to Hong Kong and was formally trained at Queen's College, Hong Kong. He left school early initially to help his fathers construction company before he joined South China AA, a Hong Kong top division team, as a youth player in 1922. By 1923 he would graduate to the senior team where he quickly showed himself as being a highly talented striker, which soon saw him called up to the Chinese national football team to represent them for the 1923 Far Eastern Championship Games held in Osaka, Japan. Within the tournament China won the championship and Lee was considered the young stand out star of the tournament.

Lee's reputation significantly grew when he returned to club football and he won the 1923–24 Hong Kong First Division League title with South China. His international reputation was solidified when he was able to retain the Far Eastern Championship Games Gold medal in the 1925 championship held in Manila, Philippines. These successful tournaments saw him reported as the greatest Chinese footballer at the time by the Chinese media. After these successes Lee returned to China and joined Fudan University in Shanghai as an athletic director. This allowed him the opportunity to join Loh Hwa, a gregarious team who were built from St. John's University, Shanghai, Shanghai Jiao Tong University, University of Shanghai, Jinan University and his own Fudan University sports team where they predominantly played in local and regional championships because they offered the only annual competitions within China during the amateur era.

In 1931 he returned to South China and won the 1932–33 Hong Kong First Division League title for the club. This would soon be followed by winning the 1934–35 and 1935–36 league titles, which was the first time ever they were able to retain the title. This was followed by China's first ever football participation in the 1936 Summer Olympics making them the joint first Asian nation along with Japan to take part in that tournament. Lee would, however struggle to see his nation participate in their first truly worldwide tournament when the Chinese government could only give 170,000 from the required 220,000 yuan the team needed to get to the Berlin Olympics. China played a series of exhibition games against Vietnam, Singapore, the Netherlands East Indies, Malaya, Burma (Myanmar) and India to gain the necessary funds for the trip. The team would reach their target and Lee would captain the side against Great Britain in the last 16 within the tournament.

After the Olympic games Lee's football career would be cut short by the Second Sino-Japanese War and World War II. Initially Lee continued with his club career with South China until Hong Kong was also occupied by the Japanese. Lee was able to escape to Kwangtung (Guangdong) and joined the Chinese Army where he spent the war playing exhibition games to raise money for the war effort. He was promoted to Major General within the sports division before returning to South China after the war. After spending several seasons with the club he retired in 1948 at the age of 43., while he holds the record for the youngest ever hat-trick scorer in an international competition, at the age of 17 years, 7 months and 7 days.

Management career, and the AFC
Lee Wai Tong's first coaching experience came while he was still a player and he took a job with Fudan University while he played for Loh Hwa. With him also captaining the Chinese side and the team not having any permanent coach Lee would manage the side for the 1934 Far Eastern Championship Games, which he also played in as China won the tournament.

In 1948 the Chinese national team reappointed Lee as coach, this time for the 1948 Summer Olympics. On a self-financed training course in the Philippines and Thailand, he took the team away for three months while they prepared for the trip to London. At the tournament, China faced Turkey in the first round and lost 4-0. After the defeat Lee returned to China in the middle of the Chinese Civil War and did not coach until after the conflict. By then his team had been split into two, the Republic of China team (later renamed Chinese Taipei as the team was unable to use  China in the FIFA membership) and the People's Republic of China team (which is ). In 1954 Lee decided to join the ROC team as their first permanent coach and lead them to win the 1954 Asian Games. He would continue to coach the team at the 1958 Asian Games where he guided the team to win the tournament once more by beating South Korea 3–2 in the final.

Along with his stint as coach he was elected as a Secretary-General of the Asian Football Confederation in 1954. In 1965 he became the Vice President of FIFA, being the first ethnic Chinese person to reach that position.

Honours

Player
South China
 Hong Kong First Division: 1923–24, 1932–33, 1934–35, 1935–36, 1937–38, 1938–39, 1939–40, 1940–41

Republic of China
 Far Eastern Games: 1923, 1925, 1927, 1930, 1934

Manager
Republic of China
 Asian Games: 1954, 1958

References

External links
 Li Huitang, o Rei do Futebol da China (Li Huitang, China's king of football) 
 世界球王——李惠堂 Li Huitang world star   (translation)
 Short biography   (translation)
 Lee Wai Tong: The King of Football (Lee Wai Tong: "The King of Football") (English)

1905 births
1979 deaths
Chinese footballers
Hong Kong footballers
Chinese football managers
Hong Kong football managers
Taiwanese football managers
China international footballers
Chinese Taipei national football team managers
Chinese Taipei international footballers from Hong Kong
Association football forwards
Footballers at the 1936 Summer Olympics
Hong Kong people of Hakka descent
People from Wuhua
Olympic footballers of China
South China AA managers
Hakka sportspeople
1960 AFC Asian Cup managers
Alumni of Queen's College, Hong Kong
South China AA players